Gertrud Rittmann (24 September 1908 – 22 February 2005) was a German Jewish composer, musical director, arranger and orchestrator who lived and worked for much of her life in the United States. Her career particularly flourished with major successes in Broadway theater.

Early years
Trude Rittmann was born in Mannheim, Germany, and began piano lessons at age eight. She studied with Ernst Toch and Hans Bruch at the Hochschule für Musik Köln, and graduated in 1932, already noted as a promising composer. Rittmann fled Germany in 1933, and worked in France, Belgium and England, and in 1937 settled in the United States. Her mother and sister escaped Germany as well, but her father died in prison under the Nazis.

Later career
In New York Rittmann was hired by Lincoln Kirstein as a concert accompanist and pianist for George Balanchine's American Ballet Caravan. She later became musical director, touring with them for four years and working with composers including Leonard Bernstein, Virgil Thomson, Aaron Copland and Marc Blitzstein.

In 1941 Rittmann and Stefan Wolpe composed the music for the film Palestine at War, made by the Palestine Labour Commission. Also in 1941 Rittmann took a position with Agnes de Mille as concert accompanist, and in 1943 did the arrangements for her choreography in the Kurt Weill/Ogden Nash musical One Touch of Venus. Rittmann went on to work on many musicals as orchestrator including Finian's Rainbow (1947), Gentlemen Prefer Blondes (1949), Peter Pan (1950 musical by Leonard Bernstein), Fanny (1954) and Peter Pan (1954 musical by Moose Charlap and Jule Styne) (1954). She also worked closely with composer Frederick Loewe on the shows Paint Your Wagon (1951), My Fair Lady (1959) and Camelot (1960).

Working on Carousel (1945), she began a long association with composer Richard Rodgers, and went on to provide arrangements on South Pacific (1949), The King and I (1951) (for which she composed the ballet "Small House of Uncle Thomas") and The Sound of Music (1959) for which she devised the extended vocal sequence for "Do-Re-Mi". According to assistant conductor Peter Howard, the heart of the number – in which Maria assigns a musical tone to each child, like so many Swiss bell ringers – was devised in rehearsal by Rittmann (who was credited for choral arrangements) and choreographer Joe Layton. The fourteen note and tune lyric – "when you know the notes to sing ..." – were provided by Rodgers and Hammerstein; the rest, apparently, came from Rittmann. Howard: "Rodgers allowed her to do whatever she liked. When we started doing the staging of it, Joe took over. He asked Trude for certain parts to be repeated, certain embellishments." Rittmann retired in 1976 and died of respiratory failure in Lexington, Massachusetts. Her music has been issued on Great Performances (1972).

Compositions and Arrangements 

 Adagio
 Carousel - Dance Arrangements
 Finian's Rainbow - Dance Arrangements
 Brigadoon - Musical Assistant to Agnes de Mille
 Look, Ma, I'm Dancin'! - Ballet Arrangements
 Gentlemen Prefer Blondes - Dance Arrangements
 Peter Pan -  Dance Arrangements
 South Pacific - Assistant to Richard Rodgers
 Miss Liberty -"Train" Dance Arrangement
 Out of this World - Incidental Music
 Dayenu : folk song
 Dayeynu
 The King and I - Ballet Arrangements
 Paint Your Wagon - Dance Arrangements
 The Climate of Eden - Incidental Music
 The Girl in Pink Tights - Ballet Arrangements
 The cherry tree legend : for baritone and soprano soli, mixed chorus (SATB) and piano
 My Fair Lady - Dance Arrangements
 A suite of moods : for piano solo
 The Sound of Music - Choral Arrangements
Christine - Dance and Vocal Arrangements
Camelot - Dance and Choral Arrangements
A Canticle of Carols. For women's voices
Hot Spot - Dance and Vocal Arrangements
Jennie - Dance and Vocal Arrangements
Darling of the Day - Dance Arrangements
Maggie Flynn - Dance Arrangements
Come Summer - Vocal Arrangements
Two By Two - Dance and Vocal Arrangements
Ambassador - Dance Arrangements
Gigi - Dance Arrangements
Four Marys
Sh'tu haadarim

References

External links
 
 
 

1908 births
2005 deaths
20th-century classical composers
20th-century German composers
American classical composers
American women classical composers
Ballet composers
German classical composers
German women classical composers
Jewish American classical composers
20th-century American composers
20th-century American women musicians
20th-century women composers
20th-century German women
20th-century American Jews
21st-century American Jews
21st-century American women
German emigrants to the United States